Sports venues in Worcestershire
Worcestershire
Lists of buildings and structures in Worcestershire